Chilango is a Mexican slang demonym for natives and residents of Mexico City. The Royal Spanish Academy and the Mexican Academy of Language give the definition of the word as referring to something "belonging to Mexico City", in particular referring to people native to the capital.

History of the term 
There are many theories on the origin of the word "chilango". One of them is that it derives from the Nahuatl word Ixachitlān, that actually refers to the whole of the American continent. The word  "shilango" has also been documented to have been used in the Veracruz area to mean people from central Mexico, and coming from the Maya "xilaan" meaning curly or frizzy haired. Yet another theory is that it comes from the Nahuatl "chilan-co", meaning where the red ones are, and referring to the skin, reddened by the cold, and used to refer to Aztecs by the Nahua people in the Gulf of Mexico

There is a popular phrase used by people outside Mexico City that says: "Haz patria, mata a un chilango" that means Be patriotic, kill a chilango. It's not intended to be used literally but with a mocking tone instead. The phrase, coined in the state of Sonora, reflects an attitude common in many states of the nation of disdain and rivalry against residents of Mexico City, that peaked in the 1980s.  Then, as a response to this used phrase, Chilangos themselves began to add "Haz patria, educa a un provinciano", which means, Be patriotic, educate a rural person.  People in Mexico City refer to people from the rest of the nation as "provinciano(a)"

Modern usage 
"Chilango pride" has also led to the term "Chilangolandia" in reference to Mexico City. The embracing of this term also led to the start of the publication of Chilango in November 2003. It is a monthly humorous magazine parodying elements of Mexico City and outsiders' perspectives of it while also including articles about actual events. It included within its pages the Time Out city guide, but this was retired in early 2007. Chilango was described in the December 2004 version as:

Related terms 
Two other terms used for a resident of Mexico City are Defeño (derived from D.F., Distrito Federal and not an official Spanish word) and Capitalino, which are also sometimes used both in a positive or a derogatory sense, although the latter is generally accepted as a neutral demonym. The terminology can also be used for a person born in the suburbs or surrounding areas of Mexico City who has moved to Mexico City. It has a negative connotation when used principally by someone in one of the States of Mexico.

See also
Mexican Spanish
Pelado

References

Notes
 Etymology of "chilango" (in Spanish)

Culture in Mexico City
Ethnic and religious slurs
Mexican Spanish
Spanish language
Regional nicknames
Demonyms